The green card is a document affirming the status of a person as a permanent resident of the United States.
 
Green card may also refer to:

Sports
 Green card, in Association football, to signal permission to enter the field of play or, in the Italian leagues, fair play
 Green card, a warning card against further infractions by a field hockey player
 Green card, a warning card against further infractions by a Pride Fighting Championships competitor

Other
 Green Card (film), a 1990 romantic comedy film
 Green card marriage, when two people get married to enable them to gain permanent residence in the US
 The Green card system: the European International Motor Insurance Card System, also based on a green card
 Green card (IBM/360), the shorthand "bible" for programmers during the late 1960s and 1970s
 "Green Card", a song by Oh Land from the album Wish Bone
 GreenCard, a smartcard ticketing system used by Metro Tasmania